Dee Long (born April 1939) is a Minnesota politician, a member of the Democratic-Farmer-Labor Party, and a former member of the Minnesota House of Representatives, representing part of Minneapolis. Long was the first woman to serve as Speaker of the Minnesota House of Representatives, a position she held from 1992 to 1993.

Long attended Northwestern University before transferring to the University of Minnesota, where she graduated magna cum laude with a degree in Psychology. She first won election to the House of Representatives in 1978, and served in the body until 1998.

Long was elected as the first female Speaker of the House in 1992. Her tenure in that position was cut short due to the "Phonegate" scandal, in which members of the House of Representatives were found to be using state toll-free access codes for personal use. Long resigned the speakership in September 1993, but continued to serve until 1998, becoming the first woman to chair the House Tax Committee.

After leaving the legislature, Long lobbied for energy independence, before retiring in 2007. She lives in Minnetonka, Minnesota.

See also
List of female speakers of legislatures in the United States

References

Speakers of the Minnesota House of Representatives
Democratic Party members of the Minnesota House of Representatives
1939 births
Living people
University of Minnesota College of Liberal Arts alumni
Harvard University alumni
American Congregationalists
Women state legislators in Minnesota
2012 United States presidential electors
21st-century American women politicians
21st-century American politicians